The Carvajal Ministry was a Spanish government which served between 1746 and 1754 during the reign of Ferdinand VI of Spain headed by José de Carvajal.

Contrasting with the previous anti-British emphasis of the Spanish government Carvajal was neutral and sought much better relations, a view shared by King Ferdinand. The government negotiated and signed the Anglo-Spanish Treaty of Madrid in 1750, resolving the issues that had taken them into the War of Jenkins' Ear. He also signed an agreement, ending a long-standing dispute with Portugal in South America.

The Ministry fell when Carvajal died in 1754, and was replaced by the short-lived Hueścar Ministry.

Spanish governments
1746 establishments in Spain
1754 disestablishments in Spain
18th century in Spain